The Bayer designation Psi Aurigae (ψ Aur, ψ Aurigae) is shared by nine star systems in the constellation Auriga and one in Lynx:
 ψ1 Aurigae ＝ 46 Aurigae
 ψ2 Aurigae ＝ 50 Aurigae
 ψ3 Aurigae ＝ 52 Aurigae
 ψ4 Aurigae ＝ 55 Aurigae
 ψ5 Aurigae ＝ 56 Aurigae
 ψ6 Aurigae ＝ 57 Aurigae
 ψ7 Aurigae ＝ 58 Aurigae
 ψ8 Aurigae ＝ 60/61 Aurigae
 ψ9 Aurigae 
 ψ10 Aurigae ＝ 16 Lyncis

The Psi Aurigae stars mostly belonged to the now obsolete constellation Telescopium Herschelii, that is now part of Auriga.

Other names of the Psi Aurigae stars include:
 Βουλήγες in Greek, meaning goads
 Dolones in Latin
 Almost of them were member of asterism 座旗 (Zuò Qí), Seat Flags, Turtle Beak mansion.

References

Auriga (constellation)
Aurigae, Psi